Jonathan David Samuel Jones (October 7, 1911 – September 3, 1985) was an American jazz drummer.  A band leader and pioneer in jazz percussion, Jones  anchored the Count Basie Orchestra rhythm section from 1934 to 1948. He was sometimes known as Papa Jo Jones to distinguish him from younger drummer Philly Joe Jones.

Biography
Born in Chicago, Illinois, United States, Jones moved to Alabama, where he learned to play several instruments, including saxophone, piano, and drums. He worked as a drummer and tap-dancer at carnival shows until joining Walter Page's band, the Blue Devils in Oklahoma City in the late 1920s. He recorded with trumpeter Lloyd Hunter's Serenaders in 1931, and later joined pianist Count Basie's band in 1934. Jones, Basie, guitarist Freddie Green and bassist Walter Page were sometimes billed as an "All-American Rhythm section," an ideal team. Jones took a brief break for two years when he was in the military, but he remained with Basie until 1948. He participated in the Jazz at the Philharmonic concert series.

He was one of the first drummers to promote the use of brushes on drums, and shifting the role of timekeeping from the bass drum to the hi-hat cymbal. Jones had a major influence on later drummers such as Buddy Rich, Kenny Clarke, Roy Haynes, Max Roach, and Louie Bellson. He also starred in several films, most notably the musical short Jammin' the Blues (1944).

Jones performed regularly in later years at the West End jazz club at 116th and Broadway in New York City. These performances were generally well attended by other drummers such as Max Roach and Roy Haynes. In addition to his artistry on the drums, Jones was known for his irascible, combative temperament. One famous instance of his irritable temper was in the spring of 1936, during a jam session at the Reno Club in Kansas City. A young Charlie Parker was attempting to play an improvised solo, but lost track of the chord changes; as a sign of contempt, Jones threw a cymbal from his drum kit onto the floor near Parker's feet to get him to leave the stage.

In contrast to the prevailing jazz drum style exemplified by Gene Krupa's loud, insistent pounding of the bass drum on each beat, Jones often omitted bass drum playing altogether. Jones also continued a ride rhythm on hi-hat, while it was continuously opening and closing instead of the common practice of only striking it while it was closed. Jones's style influenced the modern jazz drummer's tendency to play timekeeping rhythms on a cymbal, that is now known as the ride cymbal.

In 1979, Jones was inducted into the Alabama Jazz Hall of Fame for his contribution to the Birmingham, Alabama musical heritage. Jones was the 1985 recipient of an American Jazz Masters fellowship awarded by the National Endowment for the Arts.

His autobiography (as told to Albert Murray), entitled Rifftide: The Life and Opinions of Papa Jo Jones and based on conversations between Jones and novelist Murray from 1977 to before Jones' death in 1985, was posthumously published in 2011 by the University of Minnesota Press.

Known as Papa Jo Jones in his later years, he is sometimes confused with another influential jazz drummer, Philly Joe Jones. The two died only a few days apart.

Jones died of pneumonia in New York City at the age of 73.

Discography

As leader/co-leader
1955: The Jo Jones Special (Vanguard)
1957: The Coleman Hawkins, Roy Eldridge, Pete Brown, Jo Jones All Stars at Newport (Verve) with Coleman Hawkins, Roy Eldridge and Pete Brown
1958: Jo Jones Plus Two (Vanguard)
1959: Jo Jones Trio (Everest)
1960: Vamp 'til Ready (Everest)
1960: Percussion and Bass (Everest) with Milt Hinton
1969-1975: Smiles (Black & Blue)
1973: The Drums (Jazz Odyssey )
1976: The Main Man (Pablo)
1977: Papa Jo and His Friends (Denon)
1977: Our Man, Papa Jo! (Denon)

As sideman 

With Count Basie
 Count Basie at Newport (Verve, 1957)
 The Original American Decca Recordings (GRP, 1992) – rec. 1937-39

With Art Blakey
 Orgy in Rhythm (Blue Note, 1957)
 Drum Suite (Columbia, 1957)

With Milt Buckner
 Midnight Slows, Volume 4 (Black & Blue, 1974)
 Midnight Slows, Volume 5 (Black & Blue, 1974)

With Buck Clayton
 The Huckle-Buck and Robbins' Nest (Columbia, 1954)
 How Hi the Fi (Columbia, 1954)
 Jumpin' at the Woodside (Columbia, 1955)
 All the Cats Join In (Columbia 1956)

With Coleman Hawkins
 Timeless Jazz (Jazztone, 1954)
 The Hawk Flies High (Riverside, 1957)
 Jazz Reunion with Pee Wee Russell (Candid, 1961)

With Illinois Jacquet
 Swing's the Thing (Clef, 1956)
 The King! (Prestige, 1968)

With Paul Quinichette
 For Basie (Prestige, 1957)
 Basie Reunion (Prestige, 1958)
 Like Basie! (United Artists, 1959)

With Slam Stewart
 Slam Bam (Black And Blue, 1971)
 Slamboree (Black And Blue, 1972)

With Buddy Tate
 Swinging Like Tate (Felsted, 1958)
 Midnight Slows, Volume 4 (Black & Blue, 1974)
 Midnight Slows, Volume 5 (Black & Blue, 1974)

With Ben Webster
 Music for Loving (Norgran, 1954)
 Ben Webster and Associates (Verve, 1959)

With Teddy Wilson
 The Creative Teddy Wilson (Norgran, 1955) - also released as For Quiet Lovers (Verve)
 I Got Rhythm (Verve, 1956)
 The Impeccable Mr. Wilson (Verve, 1956)
 These Tunes Remind Me of You (Verve, 1959) – rec. 1956

With Lester Young
 The Jazz Giants '56 (Verve, 1956)
 Pres and Teddy (Verve, 1956)

With others
 Gene Ammons, All Star Sessions (Prestige, 1956) – rec. 1950-55
 Mae Barnes, Mae Barnes, Jo Jones, Buck Clayton, Ray Bryant (1958)
 Bob Brookmeyer, Whooeeee (Storyville, 1956) - The Zoot Sims-Bob Brookmeyer Quintet
 Ray Bryant, Ray Bryant Trio (Epic, 1956)
 Joe Bushkin, Joe Bushkin,Jo Jones,Buck Clayton (Columbia, 1951)
 Blossom Dearie, Blossom Dearie (Verve, 1957) – rec. 1956
 Roy Eldridge, Dale's Wail (Clef, 1953)
 Duke Ellington & Johnny Hodges, Side by Side (Verve, 1959)
 Ella Fitzgerald, Ella at the Opera House (Verve, 1958)
 Freddie Green, Mr. Rhythm (RCA Victor, 1955)
 Cass Harrison, Wrappin' It Up (MGM, 1957)
 Woody Herman, Songs for Hip Lovers (Verve, 1957)
 Budd Johnson, Blues a la Mode (Felsted, 1958)
 Thad Jones, The Jones Boys (Period, 1957) with Jimmy Jones, Eddie Jones and Quincy Jones
 Charles Mingus, Newport Rebels (Candid, 1960)
 Oscar Peterson, The Oscar Peterson Trio with Sonny Stitt, Roy Eldridge and Jo Jones at Newport (Verve, 1957)
 Leon Redbone, Double Time (Warner Bros., 1977)
 Sonny Stitt, Sonny Stitt Plays Arrangements from the Pen of Quincy Jones (Roost, 1955)
 Dicky Wells, Bones for the King (Felsted, 1958)

Filmography
Jammin' the Blues (1944)
The Unsuspected (1947)
Jazz Icons: Coleman Hawkins-Live in 62 & 64
L´Aventure du Jazz (1969/72-Louis Panassié)
Born to Swing (1973)
The Last of the Blue Devils (1979)

Bibliography

References

External links
Drummerworld biography with images and videos
Jo Jones at All About Jazz

1911 births
1985 deaths
American jazz drummers
Count Basie Orchestra members
Musicians from Birmingham, Alabama
Swing drummers
African-American jazz musicians
Musicians from Chicago
20th-century American drummers
American male drummers
Deaths from pneumonia in New York City
Jazz musicians from Illinois
Jazz musicians from Alabama
American male jazz musicians
Oklahoma City Blue Devils members
Jeter-Pillars Orchestra members
Black & Blue Records artists
20th-century American male musicians